( ) is a 1981 puzzle video game developed by husband and wife team Randy and Sandy Pfeiffer and published in arcades by Taito America. Qix is one of a handful of games made by Taito's American division (another is Zoo Keeper). At the start of each level, the playing field is a large, empty rectangle, containing the Qix, an abstract stick-like entity that performs graceful but unpredictable motions within the confines of the rectangle. The objective is to draw lines that close off parts of the rectangle to fill in a set amount of the playfield.

Qix was ported to the contemporary Atari 5200 (1982), Atari 8-bit family (1983), and Commodore 64 (1983), then was brought to a wide variety of systems in the late 1980s and early 1990s: MS-DOS compatible operating systems (1989), Amiga (1989), another version for the C64 (1989), Apple IIGS (1990), Game Boy (1990), Nintendo Entertainment System (1991), and Atari Lynx (1991).

Multiple home and arcade sequels followed and the concept was widely cloned. In the Gals Panic series from Kaneko, each captured area is not filled with a color, but reveals part of an image of a woman.

Gameplay

Controls consist of a four-direction joystick and two buttons: "Slow Draw" and "Fast Draw".

The player controls a diamond-shaped marker that initially moves along the edges of the playfield. Holding down one of the draw buttons allows the marker to draw a line (Stix) in unclaimed territory in an attempt to create a closed shape. Once an area is captured, it is filled with color and points are awarded based on the area claimed and drawing speed. Areas captured entirely with Slow Draw (orange-red in the screenshot) are worth double. The titular Qix is a colorful geometric figure in constant and random motion. The Qix will not actively seek out the marker, and it will not harm the marker if it collides with it while the marker is traversing the edge of the playfield or of any captured area. However, if the Qix collides with the marker as it is drawing a Stix before a new area is captured (or it touches the exposed Stix), one life is lost.

The marker cannot cross or backtrack along the line being drawn. If the marker stops while drawing, a fuse appears and burns along the line toward the marker; if it reaches the marker, the player loses one life. The fuse disappears once the marker is moved. If the player draws into a position where it cannot proceed any further, the fuse is triggered. The attract mode calls this a "Spiral Death Trap".

Sparx are enemies that traverse all playfield edges except unfinished Stix. A life is lost if one hits the marker. A meter at the top of the screen counts down to the release of additional Sparx and the mutation of all Sparx into Super Sparx, which can chase the marker along uncompleted Stix.

To complete a level, the player must claim a 75% percentage of the playfield (adjustable to be between 50% and 90%). If a level is completed by exceeding the minimum area percentage, a bonus is awarded for every 1% beyond the threshold. 

Starting in level three, the player faces two Qixes. Splitting the playfield into two regions, each containing one Qix, ends the level. No immediate bonus is awarded for this, but a bonus multiplier is applied to the scoring in all subsequent levels. This multiplier starts at two and increases by one for every additional splitting of the Qix, to a maximum of nine. Levels also add additional Sparx and the eventual appearance of only Super Sparx.

Reception

Upon release, Qix was a commercial hit. In 1983, Electronic Games reported that the game exceeded Taito's expectations, quickly rising to being one of the most popular titles of the year. The magazine attributes the game's success to it being unlike any other game at the time, specifically for its unique premise and gameplay mechanics. A year after its debut, its popularity declined and the game became largely forgotten. Keith Egging, Taito's "Director of Creativity", told Electronic Games: "Qix was conceptually too mystifying for gamers. [...] It was impossible to master and once the novelty wore off, the game faded". In Japan, it was the fifth highest-grossing arcade game of 1981. The game has since been dubbed a sleeper hit.

Qix and its home conversions have received largely positive reviews. The game was praised for its original concept and ideas, and has been described as a cultural phenomenon. Video, who reviewed the Atari 5200 release, applauded its gameplay and bizarre yet interesting premise. They reported similar reactions from players, who enjoyed its mechanics and gameplay. Video staff described the game as being a "cult phenomenon loved by a few and ignored by" more hardcore gamers. The home computer versions of Qix were praised by Russel Sipe of Computer Gaming World for its fascinating gameplay and for welcoming newcomers.

Retrospective coverage of Qix has also been positive. AllGames Brett Alan Weiss commended Qix for its addictive gameplay, technological accomplishments, and responsive controls. While he believed the graphics and sound effects were overly simplistic and crude, he said the game as a whole is "abstract minimalism at its videogame best". Retro Gamer staff enjoyed Qix particularly for its addictive nature. They compared its concept to that of the Etch A Sketch, a toy that allowed its user to draw straight lines across a small screen. The staff believed the game's simplicity was also one of its strong points, alongside its sound effects for being satisfying to hear.

Accolades 
At the 5th annual Arkie Awards in 1984, Qix received the Certificate of Merit in the category of "1984 Best Videogame Audio-Visual Effects (16K or more ROM)". In 1995, Flux magazine ranked the game 94th on their "Top 100 Video Games." In 1997, the staff at Electronic Gaming Monthly listed the Nintendo Entertainment System version at #100 on their "100 Best Games of All Time" for its risk-versus-reward system and scoring. The Killer List of Videogames listed it as #27 in their "Top 100 Video Games" list.

Legacy

Sequels
Qix II: Tournament (1982) is a version of the original Qix with a new color scheme and which awards an extra life when 90% or more of the screen is enclosed. Super Qix was released in 1987. Another sequel, Twin Qix, reached a prototype stage in 1995, but was never commercially released. The later game Volfied, also known as Ultimate Qix on Sega Genesis or Qix Neo on PlayStation, was also released on several mobile phones.

The 1990 Game Boy port of Qix was published by Nintendo with intermissions in which Mario is involved. In one, he is seen in a desert wearing Mexican clothing and playing a guitar with a vulture looking on. The outfit later appears as a costume that Mario can wear in Super Mario Odyssey. The Game Boy port was released as a Nintendo 3DS Virtual Console title in Japan on June 15, 2011, and in North America and Europe on July 7.

In 1999, a remake for the Game Boy Color was released called Qix Adventure. The player travels on a map screen, taking on opponents which appear on the playing field. Although optional, enclosing an opponent in the box opens a treasure chest, which can also be enclosed, giving the player an item. Battle Qix was released for the PlayStation in 2002 by Success, under their Super 1500 Lite budget title series. It includes a remake of the original Qix alongside a competitive multiplayer mode. Taito released a new version of Qix for the Xbox Live Arcade and PlayStation Portable Qix++ in December 2009.

Clones
 Fill 'Er Up (1983, Atari 8-bit, ANALOG Computing)
 Stix (1983, Commodore 64)
 Styx (1983, IBM PC, Windmill Software)
 Frenzy (1984, Acorn Electron and BBC Micro, Micro Power)
 Xonix (1984, MS-DOS)
 Qiks (1984, Tandy Color Computer, Spectral Associates)
 Quix (1984, Tandy Color Computer, Tom Mix Software)
 Torch 2081 (1986, Amiga, Digital Concepts)
 Zolyx (1987, Commodore 64, Commodore 16/Plus-4, Amstrad CPC, and ZX Spectrum, Firebird)
 Maniax (1988, Atari ST, Kingsoft)
 Gals Panic (1990, arcade, Kaneko), which started a subgenre of adult-themed "uncover the image" games.
 Cacoma Knight in Bizyland (1992-1993, Super NES/Famicom, Datam Polystar/Seta USA)
 Super Xonix (1996, IBM PC), a 2 player version
 Dancing Eyes (1996, arcade, Namco), a 3D version of the eroge subgenre, similar to the above Gals Panic
 AirXonix (2000-2001, Microsoft Windows, AxySoft)
 Prometheus/Qrax (1997, MacOS, Quarter Note Software)

In 2011, Den of Geek included Qix on a list of the top 10 most cloned video games.

Notes

References

Qix
1981 video games
Action video games
Amiga games
Apple IIGS games
Arcade video games
Atari 5200 games
Atari 8-bit family games
Atari Lynx games
Commodore 64 games
DOS games
FM-7 games
Game Boy games
Mobile games
NEC PC-8001 games
Nintendo Entertainment System games
Nintendo Switch games
PlayStation 4 games
Square Enix franchises
Telegames games
Virtual Console games
Video games scored by Tim Follin
Video games developed in the United States
Multiplayer and single-player video games
Atari games
Nintendo games
Takara video games
Taito arcade games
Hamster Corporation games